Fakhruddin Mubarak Shah (reigned: 1338–1349), also known simply as Fakhra, was the founder of an independent sultanate comprising modern-day eastern and southeastern Bangladesh. His kingdom was centred in the city of Sonargaon, which emerged as a principal superpower during his reign. He was also the first Muslim ruler to conquest Chittagong, the principal port of Bengal region in 1340 AD.

Early life
According to some historians, Mubarak was born into a Sunni Muslim family in a village located in the eastern part of Noakhali. Though the exact location of this village is uncertain, it is thought to be situated in the Kabirhat Upazila, with the highest probability being in that upazila's Chaprashirhat Union. Mubarak found employment as a silahdar (armour-bearer) under Bahram Khan, the governor of Sonargaon appointed by Delhi's sultan Muhammad bin Tughluq.

Reign
After the death of Bahram Khan in 737 AH (1336-1337 AD), Mubarak rose to power and declared himself as independent ruler from his proclaimed capital in Sonargaon. After hearing of Mubarak's revolt against Delhi, the Governor of Lakhnauti Qadar Khan sent a large army to suppress him. Mubarak fled from the battlefield, and his assets were captured by Qadar Khan's forces and Sonargaon was seized. However, Mubarak managed to execute Qadar Khan and regain Sonargaon by luring Qadar Khan's army who had fallen into dissension regarding the sharing of the spoils. He then appointed his servant Mukhlis to administer Lakhnauti but Mukhlis was defeated by Qadar Khan's ariz (war minister) Alauddin Ali Shah.

Mubarak's conquests of Comilla and Noakhali were followed by territorial gains to the north Sylhet and south Chittagong. His military initiatives included a successful naval action against Sultan Alauddin Ali Shah of Lakhnauti.
Shah sponsored several construction projects, including a trunk road and raised embankments, along with mosques and tombs. Ibn Batuta, after visiting his capital in 1346, described Shah as "a distinguished sovereign who loved strangers, particularly the fakirs and sufis."

The Iqlim (administrative division) of Mubarakabad is said to have been named after him.

Ikhtiyaruddin Ghazi Shah, who according to historian Jadunath Sarkar was most probably Fakhruddin's son, succeeded him and ruled the independent Sultanate from Sonargaon till 1352.

References

Year of birth missing
14th-century Indian Muslims
Sultans of Bengal
1349 deaths
People from Kabirhat Upazila
14th-century Bengalis
People from Sonargaon Upazila